Upatissa is a Sinhala name and may refer to:

 An alternate name for Sariputta, one of the chief male disciples of Gautama Buddha
 Upatissa (regent), chief minister and member of Prince Vijaya's followers, Sinhalese regent of the Kingdom of Tambapanni (505 BC–504 BC)
 Arahant Upatissa (Sri Lanka, 1st or 2nd century CE), the reputed author of the Vimuttimagga, an ancient Buddhist meditation manual
 Upatissa I of Anuradhapura, King of Anuradhapura (370–412)
 Upatissa II of Anuradhapura, King of Anuradhapura (525–526)
 Upatissa (Sri Lanka, 10th Century CE), reputed author of the Mahabodhivamsa
 Upatissa Gamanayake (1948–1989), former deputy leader of the Janatha Vimukthi Peramuna

Sinhalese masculine given names